Reflections is Jerry Garcia's third solo album, released in 1976. Partway through production, Garcia stopped recording with his solo band and brought in the members of the Grateful Dead, who performed on four songs, plus a bonus jam from 2004 release.  Three of the four Grateful Dead-performed songs had earlier live debuts: "Comes a Time" (1971), "They Love Each Other" (1973) and "It Must Have Been the Roses" (1974); "Might as Well" entered their rotation in 1976, and "Mission in the Rain" received a select few performances that same year.  Most of the songs entered the live rotation of the new Jerry Garcia Band as well.

Track listing

The album was reissued in the All Good Things: Jerry Garcia Studio Sessions box set with the following bonus tracks:

Personnel
Jerry Garcia – lead guitar, acoustic guitar, organ, synthesizer, percussion, chimes, vocals

Grateful Dead
on "Might As Well", "They Love Each Other", "It Must Have Been the Roses", "Comes a Time", "Orpheus"
Bob Weir – second guitar, background vocals
Phil Lesh – bass
Bill Kreutzmann – drums
Keith Godchaux – Fender Rhodes, acoustic piano, tack piano
Donna Jean Godchaux – background vocals ("Might as Well", "It Must Have Been the Roses")
Mickey Hart – drums, percussion
John Kahn – organ (on "They Love Each Other")

Jerry Garcia Band
on "Mission in the Rain", "I'll Take a Melody", "Tore Up Over You", "Catfish John", "Mystery Train", "All By Myself", "Oh Babe, It Ain't No Lie", "You Win Again"
Nicky Hopkins – piano
Larry Knechtel – Fender Rhodes, piano
John Kahn – bass, organ, synthesizer, vibraphone, clavinet
Ron Tutt – drums
Donna Jean Godchaux, Bob Weir – background vocals (on "I'll Take a Melody" and "Catfish John")
Mickey Hart – percussion ("I'll Take a Melody", "Tore up over You", "Catfish John")

Production
Engineer – Dan Healy
Production assistants – Steve Brown, Kidd, Ramrod, Steve Parrish
Cover – Mike Steirnagel
Art direction – Ria Lewerke
Second engineers – Rob Taylor, Willi Deenihan, Joel Edelstein
Engineer & mix-down engineer – Smiggy

References

Jerry Garcia albums
1976 albums